Dallas Lynn Peck (March 28, 1929 – August 21, 2005) was an American geologist and vulcanologist. Peck was a native of Cheney, Washington. He received his bachelor's (1951) and master's (1953) degrees in geology from the California Institute of Technology. He received a doctorate in geology from Harvard University in 1960.

Life
Dr. Peck graduated from the California Institute of Technology  and Harvard University (Ph.D., 1960). He was born March 28, 1929, in Cheney, WA. Dr. Peck had resided in Virginia.

He spent his early career studying the volcanoes and volcanic rocks of Hawaii and the western United States. In the mid-1960s, he helped train U.S. astronauts on what to expect on the lunar landscape. He also was among the first U.S. scientists to work with the Soviet Union and China in cooperative earthquake research in the 1970s.

Throughout his career, he was an adviser to the National Science Foundation, a member of the National Research Council, and representative to the Third General Meeting of the U.S.-Japan Cooperative Sciences Program. His memberships included the American Association for the Advancement of Science, the American Geophysical Union and the Cosmos Club.

Peck died on August 21, 2005 at Inova Fairfax Hospital in Fairfax, Virginia of complications from open-heart surgery in June, 2005.

USGS career
Dallas Peck was an authority on volcanoes who served as director of the U.S. Geological Survey from 1981 to 1993. He spent his entire career at the U.S. Geological Survey, starting in 1951. Peck worked in California and Hawaii before moving to the Washington, D.C. area in 1966. He was chief of the geologic division from 1977 until he was appointed director of the survey. During his tenure, he expanded the scope of the survey's work on mineral resources, global change, water quality and mapping.

Following his term as Director, he returned to the Geologic Division of USGS in 1993 to conduct research on the granites of Yosemite National Park and the Sierra Nevada and to serve as adviser in the Office of the Chief Geologist. In 1995 he retired from the USGS, but continued his research as an emeritus scientist until his death.

Awards and honors
 The Dallas Peck Outstanding Scientist Emeritus Award is names in his honor.
 He received the Interior Department's awards for meritorious (1970) and distinguished service (1979) as well as the Presidential Meritorious Executive Award (1980).
 He received the Distinguished Alumni Award from the California Institute of Technology in 1985.
 A mountain range in Antarctica was named after him in 1989.

Publications
 Geologic Map of the Yosemite Quadrangle, Central Sierra Nevada, California (2002) USGS IMAP No. 2751 
 Yosemite Quadrangle, Central Sierra Nevada, California—Analytic Data (2001) USGS Open File Report No. 2001-252 
 Karst hydrogeology in the United States, with Joseph W. Troester; John E. Moore. (1988) USGS Open File Report No. 88-476 
 Merced Peak Quadrangle, central Sierra Nevada, California; analytic data, with G.K. Van Kooten (1983) USGS Professional Paper No. 1170-D 
 Geologic map of the Merced Peak quadrangle, central Sierra Nevada, California (1980) USGS Geologic Quadrangle No. 1531
 Cooling and vesiculation of Alae lava lake, Hawaii (1978) USGS Professional Paper No. 935-B 
 The eruption of August 1963 and the formation of Alae lava lake, Hawaii (1976)  USGS Professional Paper No. 935-A 
 Geology of the central and northern parts of the Western Cascade Range in Oregon, with A.B. Griggs, H.G. Schlicker, F. G. Wells, and H.M. Dole (1964) USGS Professional Paper No. 449 
 Geologic reconnaissance of the Antelope-Ashwood area, north-central Oregon, with emphasis on the John Day Formation of late Oligocene and early Miocene age (1964) USGS Bulletin No. 1161-D 
 Preliminary geologic map of the Merced Peak quadrangle, California (1964) USGS Miscellaneous Field Studies Map No. 281
 Preliminary geologic map of the Strawberry Mine area, Madera County, California (1962) USGS Open File Report No. 62-102 
 Geologic map of Oregon west of the 121st meridian, prepared under the direction of F.G. Wells; compiled by D.L. Peck (1961) USGS IMAP No. 325 
 Geologic reconnaissance of the Western Cascades in Oregon north of latitude 43 degrees (1960) USGS Open File Report No. 60-110

References

Other sources
 Marshall, Eliot. Dallas Peck to Head USGS. Science. Vol. 212, no. 4502 (June 26, 1981) pages 1484-1485
 Drew, Lawrence J. Directions. Natural Resources Research. Volume 4, Number 2 (June, 1995)pages 125-128

External links
Photograph of Dallas Peck from U.S. Geological Survey Museum Collection
 Photograph of Dallas Peck from U.S. Geological Survey Photographic Library (Portraits Collection)
Photograph of Dallas Lynn Peck from U.S. Geological Survey History (USGS: Into the Second Century)

20th-century American geologists
1929 births
2005 deaths
United States Geological Survey personnel
American volcanologists
People from Cheney, Washington
California Institute of Technology alumni
Harvard University alumni